Seethathodu is a village in the Pathanamthitta district, state of Kerala, India, near Chittar Town. Predominantly it is a rural region where agriculture being the most important sector. Both state-run and privately operated buses connect Seethathodu to various parts of Pathanamthitta district.

Geography 
Seethathodu is a scenic hilly rural region in the eastern side of Pathanamthitta district. Many mountains, valleys and steep slopes beautifies its geographical background.
90% of the area is dense reserve forest, a part of Goodrical Range, Periyar Tiger Reserve. The rest is populated, where the main cultivation is rubber. 
The main attraction of Seethathodu is Sabarimala, a Hindu hill pilgrim centre.
Kakkad Hydro Electric Project Power Plant, India is located at Seethathode,(capacity of 50 MWe). It has 2 units. The first unit was commissioned in 1998 and the last in 1999. It is operated by Kerala State Electricity Board.
Sabarigiri - The second largest hydroelectric project in Kerala, Sabarigiri, is located in this village.
It is one of the biggest panchayaths in Kerala with an area of about 651.94 km2.But almost 602.7 km2 area is covered by dense forests. The habitable area is only about 4924 acres.

History 
The Koikkal rajas of Pandalam divided their kingdom into two parts as Valiyakoyikkal (including the parts of Pandalam) and Kochukoikkal (including the western parts) for administrative convenience. Kochukoikkal is today a part of Seethathodu panchayath. Advocate Kochukoikkal Thalachira Barayanan founded the first school (S.N.D.P school) in this region. Seethathodu panchayath was formed on 20 November 1968 and T.K Raghavan became the first president.

Administration 
Joby T Easow is the current president of Seethathodu panchayath and Beena Muhammed Rafi is the vice president. Communist, Congress & BJP parties have strong base here. The panchayath itself is self-sufficient in the case of basic infrastructures and the members of each wards are so concerned about the developmental activities.

Wards in Seethathodu panchayath
Seethathodu
Gavi
Angamoozhy
Kottamonpara
Palathadiyar
Valupara
Kambiline
Kochukoickal
Kottakuzhi
Gurunathanmannu
Seethakuzhi
Moonukallu
Allungal

Demographics
 India census, Seethathodu panchayath has a population of about 18222 in which 9268 are males and 8954 are females. The village has literacy of 92.4%. More than 95% of the population speaks Malayalam and 4% speak Tamil. There are also some English and Hindi speakers. Hindi speakers are relatively new immigrant workers from North India.

Educational institutions

Schools

K.R.P.M H.S.S Seethathodu
Govt. H. S. S., Chittar
Govt. Model L. P. S., Chittar
V. K. N. M. V. H. S. S, Vayyattupuzha
Holy Family Public School, Chittar
Komala Vilasm School, Padayanippara
Little Angels English Medium School Chittar
Royal Parallel College, Chittar
Santhi Niketan Parallel College, Chittar
Ideal Parallel College, Chittar
Mountzion U.P.S (formerly Gurkulam U.P.S) Angamoozhy
S.A.V.H.S Angamoozhy
Cherupushpam Eng. Medium School Angamoozhy
Govt.tribal UP School, Mundanpara
M.M.A.M. English Medium School, Kochukoickal

Nearby Colleges
 Musaliar college of arts and science, Pathanamthitta
Mar Ivanios ITC, Seethathodu
SNDP College, Chittar
SAS SNDP Yogam College, Konni
NSS College, Konni
Caarmel Engineering College, Ranni-Perunad
Musalliar Engineering College, Malayalappuzha
Mount Zion Engineering College, Kadammanitta
Pushpagiri Medical College, Tiruvalla
Muthoot Nursing College, Pathanamthitta
St. Thomas College, Ranni
Catholicate College, Pathanamthitta

health care
 Government PHC  SEETHATHODU and ANGAMOOZHY
 MEDICURE hospital moonnukallu

Transportation
Airports :Thiruvananthapuram International Airport and kochi's Cochin International Airport s are at almost the same distance from Seethathodu (about a three-hour drive). And the nearest airport is the upcoming Airport Project @ ERUMELI- SABARIGIRI International Airport.
Railways : The nearest railway stations are Chengannur (60 km), and Thiruvalla (65 km).
Roads :the main roads are Vadasserikara - Chittar - Angamoozhy - Plappally Road, Pathanamthitta - Angamoozhy - kumily.
Buses : All major long-route buses stop at Seethathodu Junction.
Local Transport : Taxi's (Auto-rickshaws, Cars etc.) are available at every road and at all major junctions they have their slots. Smaller buses ply on regular intervals to the internal locations, as there are narrow roads.

See also  
 Plappally
 Nilakkal
 Angamoozhy
 Vayyattupuzha
 Gavi

References

 YouTube : https://www.youtube.com/watch?v=_uQF7NWhyAA
 Kerala Tourism :http://www.keralatourism.org/routes-locations/seethathodu/id/41340

Villages in Pathanamthitta district